Dan Kwong is an American performance artist, writer, teacher and visual artist. He has been presenting his solo performances since 1989, often drawing upon his own life experiences to explore personal, historical, and social issues.

His works intertwine storytelling, multimedia, dynamic physical movement, poetry, martial arts and music. He has been an artist with the multicultural performing arts organization Great Leap since 1990 and assumed the position of Associate Artistic Director in 2011 and a resident artist at the 18th Street Arts Center in Santa Monica, California since 1992.

Early life 
The Kwong family moved to Silver Lake, Los Angeles, then a working-class neighborhood with primarily Asian and African American families, in 1960. Kwong has three sisters. His father was a commercial photographer from China. His mother was a Japanese American weaver who was interned at Manzanar. 

Kwong is a graduate of the School of the Art Institute of Chicago.

Major solo performances 

 Secrets of the Samurai Centerfielder 1989
 Tales From the Fractured Tao 1991
 Monkhood in 3 Easy Lessons 1993
 Correspondence of a Dangerous Enemy Alien 1995
 The Dodo Vaccine 1996
 The Night the Moon Landed on 39th Street 1999
 It's Great 2B American (2008)
 What? No Ping-Pong Balls? (with musician Kenny Endo) 2013

These works explore subjects such as cultural confusion and discovery in a mixed heritage family; allergic reactions to “Model Minority Syndrome"; dysfunctional family "Asian American-style"; Asian male identity; Japanese American internment during WWII; the impact of HIV/AIDS on Asian Americans; the American space program; and Asian American single motherhood. Kwong has performed in venues across the United States and in England, Hong Kong, Thailand, Indonesia, Cambodia, Mexico, Canada, China and Korea.

Major collaborative performances 

 Samurai Centerfielder Meets The Mad Kabuki Woman (with Denise Uyehara) 1997
 The Art of Rice (international ensemble) 2003
 Sleeping With Strangers (with Chinese opera artist Peng Jingquan. Beijing, China) 2006
 Once We Wanted (with dancer/choreographer Iu-Hui Chua) 2011

Plays 

Kwong's first play, Be Like Water, was developed with Cedar Grove OnStage and received its world premiere at East West Players in Los Angeles, in September 2008. The play, directed by Chris Tashima, is about a teenage girl who is trained by the ghost of Bruce Lee to deal with her bullies, rivals and parents. The title is derived from the Lee quote: "Be formless ... shapeless, like water."

In 2019, Kwong began writing a play with Ruben "Funkahuatl" Guevara of Ruben and the Jets based on the short story Masao and the Bronze Nightingale, by Guevara. The story, funded by the Eastside Initiative via Casa 0101 Theater, explores the historical stories between the communities of Boyle Heights, Los Angeles and Little Tokyo, Los Angeles post-World War II.

Other Performance Projects 

Tales of Little Tokyo - In summer of 2018, Kwong was one of four artists selected (with filmmaker Tina Takemoto, painter Susu Attar, calligrapher Kuni Yoshida) for the inaugural +LAB Artist Residency, sponsored by the Little Tokyo Service Center. For 3 months the artists lived in the historic old Daimaru Hotel on First Street and created community-based art projects on the theme of "Self-determination and Community Control" for Little Tokyo—a 134-year-old community now threatened by gentrification. Each artist was partnered with a local organization for their project, Dan being paired with the Japanese American National Museum. For his project Dan interviewed over 50 people with various relationships to Little Tokyo past and present, ranging in age from 97 to 17. After transcribing and editing hundreds of their stories, he selected approx. 30 to create a portrait of the community through the decades, showing its significance to people over generations. It was presented as a reading with veteran Nisei actress Takayo Fischer at JANM's Democracy Forum at the end of July. Tales of Little Tokyo is still being developed to incorporate more stories and a multimedia component. It was presented in this latest form in January 2020 with Takayo Fischer and the addition of actress Hanna-Lee Sakakibara, once again at the Tateuchi Democracy Forum at JANM.

Stage Directing 

In January/February 2019 Dan directed and dramaturged the world premiere of Tales of Clamor, by traci kato-kiriyama and Kennedy Kabesares. Along with traci and Kennedy, cast included Takayo Fischer, Kurt Kuniyoshi, Jully Lee, Sharon Omi and Greg Watanabe. The show had a 4-week run at the Aratani Black Box Theater at the Japanese American Cultural and Community Center in Los Angeles.

Confessions of a Radical Chicano Doo-Wop Singer - In the summer of 2016 Kwong directed Ruben "Funkahuatl" Guevara's critically acclaimed solo performance/reading of Confessions of a Radical Chicano Doo-Wop Singer produced at Casa 0101 in Boyle Heights. Based on excerpts from Guevara's memoir of the same title, Confessions was also staged at the Mark Taper Auditorium of L.A. Main Public Library downtown in 2017.

FandangObon - Since its inception in 2013 Dan has directed this annual cross-cultural event of traditional Japanese, Mexican and West African music and dance. FandangObon brings together the traditions of Japanese Obon, son jarocho from Mexico, and West African drumming and dance. The free public event takes place every fall in Noguchi Plaza at the Japanese American Cultural & Community Center (JACCC) in Little Tokyo.

Video 

Since 2010 Kwong has directed and edited an ongoing series of environmental music videos in collaboration with singer/songwriter Nobuko Miyamoto, produced by Great Leap: B.Y.O. CHOPSTIX (2010), MOTTAINAI (2011), and CYCLES OF CHANGE (2012), all featuring Miyamoto as the lead character. CYCLES OF CHANGE was created in collaboration with the Grammy Award-winning Chicano rock band QUETZAL and features their lead singer Martha Gonzalez. All videos can be seen on YouTube under the Great Leap channel, and can be found through greatleap.org.

In Fall of 2014 Kwong began work on a documentary/art video project, The House on Robinson Road. The video will explore the legacy of Kwong's great-grandfather through his house on Hong Kong island (built in 1933 for him, his wife, 5 concubines and 21 children), and its connection to Kwong's relationship with his own father within the context of owning-class colonial HK-Chinese society. In December 2017 Dan returned to HK for more shooting, this time assisted by independent filmmaker Max Good. The project remains in-progress.

In 2021 Kwong produced two feature-length documentaries:
 
He was writer, director and lead editor for We Were All Here, chronicling the multicultural history of the Santa Monica neighborhood known as La Veinte (or the Pico Neighborhood) through the story of the Casillas family, Santa Monica's largest single family to immigrate from Mexico. We Were All Here was commissioned by 18th Street Arts Center and created in collaboration with artist Paulina Sahagun.

He was Executive Producer (with Ruben Guevara III) for Con Safos, produced for public television station KCET's ArtBound series. Con Safos uncovers Ruben Funkahuatl Guevara's unique role in the evolution of Chicano culture, especially through music.

Teaching / Curating 

In 1994 Kwong founded the Asian American Men's Writing and Performing Workshop in Los Angeles to tackle Asian stereotypes in media. With a grant from the Los Angeles Cultural Affairs Dept. he created "Everything You Ever Wanted to Know About Asian Men...", a series of performance workshops specifically focused on Asian American men exploring their identities.

As a teacher Kwong has led numerous workshops in autobiographical writing and performing throughout the U.S. and in Hong Kong, Indonesia, Thailand, Canada and Japan. In 1991 he  founded “Treasure In The House,” L.A.’s first Asian Pacific American performance and visual art festival, presented at Highways Performance Space in Santa Monica, California, serving as its curator until 2003.

His "Everything You Ever Wanted to Know About Asian Men..." workshops resulted in the creation of similar groups (led by "alumni" of the original group) in New York, New Haven, Boston, Portland, Philadelphia and beyond, playing a key role in the development of succeeding generations of Asian American solo performers. Since 2005 he has served as Project Director of "Collaboratory", Great Leap's mentorship program designed to develop the next generation of artist-leaders in Los Angeles.

Bibliography 

 FROM INNER WORLDS TO OUTER SPACE – The Multimedia Performances of Dan Kwong (2004, University of Michigan Press)

References

External links 
 Official website
 From Inner Worlds to Outer Space at University of Michigan Press
 Dan Kwong bio on rebollardance.com

1954 births
Living people
American performance artists
American male dramatists and playwrights
American dramatists and playwrights of Chinese descent
American writers of Chinese descent
American dramatists and playwrights of Japanese descent
American writers of Japanese descent
Asian Cultural Council grantees
Place of birth missing (living people)
School of the Art Institute of Chicago alumni